Antonio de Ulloa y de la Torre-Giralt, FRS, FRSA, KOS (12 January 1716 – 3 July 1795) was a Spanish naval officer, scientist, and administrator.  At the age of nineteen, he joined the French Geodesic Mission to what is now the country of Ecuador.  That mission took more than eight years to complete its work, during which time Ulloa made many astronomical, natural, and social observations in South America.  The reports of Ulloa's findings earned him an international reputation as a leading savant.  Those reports include the first published observations of the metal platinum, later identified as a new chemical element.  Ulloa was elected as a Fellow of the Royal Society of London in 1746, and as a foreign member of the Royal Swedish Academy of Sciences in 1751.

Ulloa served the Spanish Crown as governor of Huancavelica (1758–64), in Perú, and superintendent of the quicksilver mines in the region.  Following the defeat of France in the Seven Years' War, Ulloa was appointed as the first Spanish governor of Louisiana in 1766.  His rule was strongly resisted by the French Creole colonists in New Orleans, who expelled him from the city in the Louisiana Rebellion of 1768.  Ulloa continued to serve in the Spanish Navy, achieving the rank of vice-admiral and becoming its chief of operations.

Life

Family background and education 

Antonio de Ulloa was born in Seville, Spain, into an aristocratic and intellectually distinguished family. His father, Bernardo de Ulloa, was noted for his writings on economics. His brother Fernando would become an engineer and the chief of works of the Canal de Castilla.  Destined for a naval career, at the age of thirteen Antonio embarked in Cádiz on the galleon San Luis, bound for the port of Cartagena de Indias (in present-day Colombia).  After returning to Cádiz, Antonio entered the Real Compañía de Guardias Marinas (the Spanish Naval Academy) in 1733.

South American expedition 

At that time the French Academy of Sciences was organizing a major scientific expedition to Quito, in present-day Ecuador, in order to measure the length of a degree of meridian arc (i.e., latitude) at the equator.  This was part of an effort to determine in the precise figure of the Earth in order to settle the scientific debate between the defenders of René Descartes's physics and those who advocated the newer Newtonian mechanics.  In 1735, Ulloa and another young naval officer, Jorge Juan, were appointed by the Spanish Crown to accompany the French Geodesic Mission to Quito.  This was a sensitive assignment, both politically and scientifically.

The early work of the French Geodesic Mission, led by Charles Marie de La Condamine, was delayed and hindered by lack of cooperation from the local Spanish authorities.  Indeed, in 1737 the personal dispute between Ulloa and the president of the Real Audiencia de Quito, Joseph de Araujo y Río, reached such a pitch that Araujo ordered the arrest of Ulloa and Juan, announcing his intention to have them killed. Juan and Ulloa took refuge in a church and Ulloa then escaped through the cordon of Araujo's men, reaching Lima and obtaining the protection of the Viceroy of Peru, the Marquis of Villagarcía. When war between Spain and Great Britain broke out in 1739 (see War of Jenkins' Ear), Juan and Ulloa, as naval officers, actively participated in the defense of Peru.

Ulloa traveled throughout the territories of the Viceroyalty of Peru from 1736 to 1744, making many astronomic, natural, and social observations.  In one of his reports he described, for the first time in the European scientific literature, some of the properties of a metal that he called platina ("little silver") and which he encountered during his inspection the gold panning operations in the Chocó region of what is now Colombia.  This metal would later be identified as a new chemical element, now known as platinum. Ulloa is therefore often credited as the discoverer of platinum. 

The final results of French Geodesic Mission, published by La Condamine in 1745, combined with the measurements of meridian arc near the Arctic Circle that had been published in 1738 by Pierre Louis Maupertuis following the French Geodesic Mission to Lapland, decisively vindicated the predictions first made by Isaac Newton in Book III of his Principia Mathematica of 1687.  These results greatly contributed to the triumph of Newtonianism over Cartesianism among Continental European savants.

Return to Spain 

In 1745, having finished their scientific labours, Ulloa and Jorge Juan prepared to return to Spain, agreeing to travel on different ships in order to minimize the danger of losing their important samples and records.  The ship upon which Ulloa was travelling was captured by the British Royal Navy, and he was taken to England as a prisoner of war. In Britain, however, Ulloa was soon befriended by leading men of science.  He was elected as a Fellow of the Royal Society of London in December 1746.  Thanks in part to the intervention of Martin Folkes, the President of the Royal Society, Ulloa was released from custody and allowed to return to Spain.

In 1749, Ulloa published his Relación histórica del viaje a la América Meridional (Madrid, 1748), which contains a full, accurate, and clear description of the greater part of South America geographically, and of its inhabitants and natural history. It was translated into English and published in 1758 as A Voyage to South America (1758).

Shortly after their return to Spain, Juan and Ulloa penned a confidential report to their political patron, the Marquess of Ensenada, on the state of the defenses and administration of the Spanish domains in South America.  The document is highly critical of the corruption of both the civil authorities and the Catholic clergy, including their exploitation of the Native American population.  That report remained unpublished during the lifetimes of its authors.  It only became public in 1826, after the independence of South America from Spain, when it was published in London by an Englishman named David Barry.

Ulloa gained an international scientific reputation and he was appointed to serve on various important scientific commissions. With Jorge Juan, he is credited with the establishment of the first museum of natural history, the first metallurgical laboratory in Spain, and the astronomical observatory of Cádiz. In 1751, Ulloa was elected as a foreign member of the Royal Swedish Academy of Sciences.

Imperial administrator 

Ulloa returned to South America in 1758 as governor of Huancavelica, in Peru, and general manager of the quicksilver mines in the region.  At the time, quicksilver (mercury) was of great practical importance because of its use in the extraction of silver and gold.  Ulloa fought unsuccessfully against the deep-rooted corruption in the local administration and finally requested to be relieved of his post in 1764.

Following the defeat of France by Britain in the Seven Years' War, France agreed in the secret Treaty of Fontainebleau to cede to Spain its remaining territories in North America.  The Spanish Crown then appointed Ulloa as the first governor of Spanish Louisiana.  Ulloa reached New Orleans, the major city and port of the region, on 5 March 1766. The French Creole colonists refused to recognize Spanish rule, leading to the Louisiana Rebellion of 1768. On 28 October, as riots broke out in New Orleans, the governor and his pregnant wife were taken to a Spanish vessel.  The Superior Council voted that the governor leave within three days. He complied, departing on 1 November. The revolt was ultimately crushed in 1769 by forces under the command of the new Spanish governor, Alejandro O'Reilly, who succeeded in establishing definitively the control of the region by the Spanish Crown.

Between 1776 and 1778, in the context of the American Revolutionary War, in which Spain supported the fight against British rule of the Thirteen Colonies, Ulloa helped organize a fleet of the Viceroyalty of New Spain (present-day Mexico) and construction of a military shipyard in the Atlantic port of Veracruz.  He was in command of the last great naval fleet to sail from Cádiz to the Americas.

Later years 

In 1768, while serving in New Orleans as governor of Spanish Louisiana, Ulloa married a woman from the high society of Lima, Francisca Melchora Rosa Ramírez de Laredo y Encalada, daughter of the Count of San Javier y Casa Laredo.  The couple had six children, among them Francisco Javier de Ulloa who became the Spanish Minister of Marine and the 22nd Captain general of the Navy.

In 1779, Ulloa was promoted to teniente general de la Armada (i.e., vice-admiral). In that same year he participated in the Great Siege of Gibraltar, but failure to prevent the first British relief of Gibraltar led to charges of dereliction of duty against Ulloa and two captains under his command, Pedro de Leyba and Manuel Núñez Gaona.  The drawn-out military justice proceedings ended with Ulloa's acquittal.  Ulloa was later appointed as chief of operations of the Spanish Navy, a position that he occupied at the time of his death in 1795.

Legacy 

Besides his role in the determination of the figure of the Earth and his pioneering reports on platinum, Ulloa is also remembered in science for his description of the meteorological phenomenon known as "Ulloa's halo", or sometimes "Bouguer's halo", which an observer may see infrequently in fog when the sun breaks through (for example, on a mountain).  This is a fog bow, as opposed to a rainbow. A fog-bow is defined as "an infrequently observed meteorological phenomenon; a faint white, circular arc or complete ring of light that has a radius of 39 degrees and is centered on the antisolar point. When observed, it is usually in the form of a separate outer ring around an anticorona."

The confidential report to the Marquess of Ensenada, signed jointly by Jorge Juan and Antonio de Ulloa and written around 1746, remained unknown to the public until it was published in London in 1826 by an Englishman named David Barry, under the title Noticias secretas de América ("Secret News from America"). Barry had spent some time in the newly independent Spanish America seeking opportunities for investment, only to become thoroughly disillusioned about the prospects for the region.  The Noticias secretas paints a dire picture of the state of the administration of the Spanish dominions in America in the 1730s and 1740s, alleging many instances of official corruption and mismanagement by both the civil and the ecclesiastical authorities, and denouncing the exploitation of the Native American population by unscrupulous governors and priests.  As such, it has caused enduring controversy among historians of Spanish America.

Tributes 
 In 2016, Spain issued a stamp in tribute to Antonio de Ulloa.

References

External links
Antonio de Ulloa. Polymath Virtual Library, Fundación Ignacio Larramendi
|Antonio de Ulloa y Jorge Juan Santacilia, Cervantes Virtual

1716 births
1795 deaths
18th-century Spanish astronomers
Spanish meteorologists
Discoverers of chemical elements
Spanish generals
Spanish explorers
Governors of Spanish Louisiana
Spanish colonial governors and administrators
People of New Spain
Members of the Royal Swedish Academy of Sciences
People from Seville
Fellows of the Royal Society